Arsenic pentachloride is a chemical compound of arsenic and chlorine. This compound was first prepared in 1976 through the UV irradiation of arsenic trichloride, AsCl3, in liquid chlorine at −105 °C. AsCl5  decomposes at around −50 °C. The structure of the solid was finally determined in 2001.  AsCl5 is similar to phosphorus pentachloride, PCl5 in having a trigonal bipyramidal structure where the equatorial bonds are shorter than the axial bonds (As-Cleq = 210.6 pm, 211.9 pm; As-Clax= 220.7 pm).

The pentachlorides of the elements above and below arsenic in group 15, phosphorus pentachloride and antimony pentachloride are much more stable and the instability of AsCl5 appears anomalous. The cause is believed to be due to incomplete shielding of the nucleus in the 4p elements following the first transition series (i.e. gallium, germanium, arsenic, selenium, bromine, and krypton) which leads to stabilisation of their 4s electrons making them less available for bonding. This effect has been termed the d-block contraction and is similar to the f-block contraction normally termed the lanthanide contraction.

References

Arsenic(V) compounds
Chlorides
Arsenic halides
Substances discovered in the 1970s